Geoffrey Hayes (1942–2018) was an English television presenter and actor.

Geoffrey Hayes may also refer to:
Geoffrey Hayes (cricketer) (born 1950), English cricketeer
Geoffrey Hayes (artist) (1940–2017), American artist

See also
Geoff Hayes (1933–1994), Australian politician
Jeff Hayes (born 1959), American football player